Fieldale is a census-designated place (CDP) in Henry County, Virginia, United States. The population was 879 at the 2010 census. It is part of the Martinsville Micropolitan Statistical Area.

History
The area was first settled in 1770 by planter George Waller, an officer in the state militia who was later promoted to Colonel, and his wife Ann Winston (Carr), first cousin of statesman Patrick Henry, as a protected ford across the Smith River. The local militia trained on Col. Waller's acreage. The settlement was subsequently known as Waller's Ford for over a century.  A Virginia Historical Highway Marker unveiled in September 2017 marks the location of Col. Waller's plantation. In 1916, Marshall Field & Company purchased the site from the Waller heirs and established Fieldcrest Mills, the town of Fieldale, and an  company clubhouse, all completed in 1919.

The Fieldale Historic District, Marshall Field and Company Clubhouse, and Virginia Home are listed on the National Register of Historic Places.

Geography
Fieldale is located at  (36.699850, −79.939482).

According to the United States Census Bureau, the CDP has a total area of 1.6 square miles (4.2 km2), all of it land.

Demographics

As of the census of 2000, there were 929 people, 420 households, and 275 families residing in the CDP. The population density was 575.6 people per square mile (222.8/km2). There were 473 housing units at an average density of 293.1/sq mi (113.4/km2). The racial makeup of the CDP was 97.20% White, 1.83% African American, 0.11% Pacific Islander, and 0.86% from two or more races. Hispanic or Latino of any race were 1.08% of the population.

There were 420 households, out of which 21.4% had children under the age of 18 living with them, 50.7% were married couples living together, 10.7% had a female householder with no husband present, and 34.5% were non-families. 31.9% of all households were made up of individuals, and 16.9% had someone living alone who was 65 years of age or older. The average household size was 2.21 and the average family size was 2.78.

In the CDP, the population was spread out, with 20.3% under the age of 18, 4.8% from 18 to 24, 25.5% from 25 to 44, 25.3% from 45 to 64, and 24.0% who were 22 years of age or older. The median age was 44 years. For every 100 females, there were 96.8 males. For every 100 females age 18 and over, there were 86.4 males.

The median income for a household in the CDP was $23,450, and the median income for a family was $30,845. Males had a median income of $25,278 versus $18,472 for females. The per capita income for the CDP was $12,919. About 19.4% of families and 22.0% of the population were below the poverty line, including 34.5% of those under age 18 and 18.8% of those age 65 or over.

References

External links
 History of Fieldale, Waller's Ford, and Marshall Field Clubhouse 
 History from Fieldale Heritage Festival 
 National Register of Historic Places nomination form for Marshall Field clubhouse; includes history of town on pp. 7–10 
 Waller Home in 1930, myhenrycounty.com

Census-designated places in Henry County, Virginia
Census-designated places in Virginia
Martinsville, Virginia micropolitan area